Maurice Jaubert (3 January 1900 – 19 June 1940) was a French composer. A prolific composer, he scored some of the most important films of the early sound era in France, including Jean Vigo’s Zero for Conduct and L’Atalante, and René Clair’s Quatorze Juillet and Le Dernier Milliardaire. Serving in both world wars, he died in action during World War II at the age of 40.

Life and career
Born in Nice on 3 January 1900, he was the second son of François Jaubert, a lawyer who would become the president of the Nice bar.

Jaubert grew up in a musical household, and began playing the piano aged five. After gaining his baccalaureat from the Lycée Masséna in 1916, he enrolled at the Nice Conservatory of music where he studied harmony, counterpoint and piano. He was awarded the first piano prize in 1916.

Early career
Jaubert left for Paris and studied law and literature at the Sorbonne. When he returned to his native town in 1919, he was the youngest lawyer in France. His first compositions date from this period but soon after he undertook his military service and became officer in engineering. Demobilized in 1922, Jaubert decided to give up law practice and devote all his time to music. The next year, he completed his musical education in Paris with Albert Groz, while undertaking a variety or music related jobs such as proof correction and checking Pleyela rolls.

Jaubert's compositions in the early 1920s include songs, piano pieces, chamber music, and divertissements. He wrote his first stage music in 1925 for a play by Calderon, Le Magicien prodigieux, using the Pleyela. He was then hired by Pleyel to record rolls on the Pleyela, a revolutionary player piano at the time. Indeed, Jaubert was always attracted by technical innovations that could serve his artistic aspirations. While working on this play, he met a young soprano, Marthe Bréga, who would sing most of his vocal composItions. They married in 1926, with Maurice Ravel as Jaubert's best man. They had a daughter, Françoise, in 1927. His 'poème chorégraphique' Le Jour was premiered by the Orchestre Symphonique de Paris under Pierre Monteux in 1931, while a Suite française was premiered by Vladimir Golschmann in St Louis the following year.

Film scores
In 1929, while pursuing his work for the concert hall and the stage, Maurice Jaubert began writing and conducting for cinema. Among his most important collaborations in the following decade were Alberto Cavalcanti’s Le Petit Chaperon Rouge; Jacques and Pierre Prévert's L'Affaire est dans le sac; Jean Vigo’s Zero for Conduct and L’Atalante; René Clair’s Quatorze Juillet and Le Dernier Milliardaire; Julien Duvivier’s Carnet de bal (Life Dances On) and La Fin du Jour (The End of a Day); Henri Storck’s Belgian documentaries LÎle de Pâques and Regards sur la Belgique ancienne; and Marcel Carné’s Drôle de drame, Hôtel du Nord, Quai des brumes (Port of Shadows), and Le Jour se lève (Daybreak).

He also worked briefly in the UK, scoring We Live in Two Worlds directed by Alberto Cavalcanti and produced by John Grierson.

Conductor
Although Jaubert understood and appreciated film, composing and scoring them was but one of Jaubert's creative activities. As music director of Pathé-Nathan studio, he conducted the film scores of several other composers, including Arthur Honegger and Darius Milhaud. In the 1930s he gained a reputation as a conductor in France and abroad, most notably for the final season of Marguerite Bériza's opera company and the season of opéras-bouffes for the 1937 exposition (where he also led the premiere of his Jeanne d’Arc, opus 61, a 'Symphonie concertante pour soprano et orchestre'). At the Comédie des Champs-Élysées, in 1937 he conducted the premiere of Philippine, an opérette, by Delannoy with libretto by Henri Lyon and Jean Limozin. His music was written in a style of clarity, frankness and freedom, in which he did not seek novelty for the sake of it and in which his spontaneity is not weighed down by pedantic formulas.

His writings comprise articles and lectures, as well as a large number of letters that capture his political opinions. how he viewed his times, and his musical tastes (for example, he was a strong supporter of Kurt Weill when that composer was widely misunderstood).

Death
War, however, disrupted Jaubert's artistic path. Mobilized in September 1939, he joined an engineering company he would command as a reserve captain. His letters to his wife reflect a spirit of sacrifice tinged with deep humanism. Jaubert did not live to hear his last two compositions, written at his base camp. He was fatally wounded after having successfully blown up a bridge, he died a few hours later at the Baccarat Hospital on 19 June 1940.

Concert works 
 Impromptu (?) : for piano
 6 Inventions (?) : for piano
 Suite en la (?) : for cello and piano
 4 Romances (1924) : for voice and piano
 Cinq chants sahariens (1924) : for voice and small ensemble
 Les Pêcheurs (1925) : ballet
 Chants de la Côte (1925) «Popular Songs from Provence and Nice county» harmonized for one voice and piano
 Contrebande (1927) : chamber opera based on a text by Georges Neveux
 The Lie of Nina Petrovna (1929) : suite for piano taken from the cinematic score
 Intermezzo (1929) : for piano and orchestra, taken from his cinematic score The Lie of Nina Petrovna
 Cinq danses de l'Amazonie (1930) : for orchestra
 Le jour (1931) : choreographic poem for symphony orchestra
 Suite française (1932) : for orchestra
 Quatorze Juillet (1933) : suite of danses for piano taken from his cinematic score
 Ode à la Montagne (1933) : for orchestra
 Deus Abraham (1934) : motet
 Ballade (1934) : «Symphonie de Lewis» for orchestra, taken from Tessa
 The Little Riding Hood (1935) : suite for piano, burlesque suite for 12 instruments 
 Nativité (1935) : cantate for soli, choir and orchestra 
 Cantate pour le temps pascal (1935) : for soli, choir and orchestra
 Trio italien (1935) : for violin, viola and cello
 Sonate a due (1936) : for violon, cello and string orchestra
 Concert flamand (1936) : for orchestra
 Intermèdes (1936) for string orchestra
 Normandie (1937) : ballet for orchestra
 Géographies (1937) : for choir and orchestra
 Jeanne d'Arc (1937) : symphonie concertante for soli, choir and orchestra
 Proses (1938) : pour mixed choir and orchestra
 L'Eau vive (1938) : « 5 chants de métier from Haute-Provence» based on texts by Jean Giono
 Caprice italien (1938) : concerto for string orchestra
 Saisir (1939) : five melodies for soprano and small orchestra
 Trois Psaumes pour le temps de guerre (1940) : for women choir, harp and piano

Filmography 
 1926: Nana by Jean Renoir
 1929: The Lie of Nina Petrovna (Die wunderbare Lüge der Nina Petrowna) by Hanns Schwarz
 1930: The Little Riding Hood by Alberto Cavalcanti 
 1931: La Vie d'un fleuve, la Seine short feature documentary by Jean Lods
 1931: Au pays du scalp (documentary) by Robert de Wavrin
 1932: L'affaire est dans le sac by Pierre Prévert
 1933: L'Homme mystérieux short feature by Maurice Tourneur
 1933: Bastille Day) by René Clair
 1933: Zero for Conduct by Jean Vigo
 1933: Mirages de Paris by Fedor Ozep
 1934: L'Île de Pâques documentary by John Fernhout and Henri Storck
 1934: L'Atalante by Jean Vigo
 1934: The Last Billionaire by René Clair
 1935:    by Maurice Tourneur (Orchestra conducting)
 1936: Mayerling by Anatole Litvak
 1936: Barbe-Bleue (animated short feature) by Jean Painlevé
 1936: La Vie parisienne by Robert Siodmak
 1937: We Live in Two Worlds short feature documentary by Alberto Cavalcanti 
 1937: Un carnet de bal by Julien Duvivier
 1937: Drôle de drame by Marcel Carné
 1938: Les Filles du Rhône by Jean-Paul Paulin
 1938: Port of Shadows by Marcel Carné
 1938: Altitude 3200 by Jean Benoît-Lévy and Marie Epstein
 1938: Hôtel du Nord by Marcel Carné
 1939: Violons d'Ingres short feature by Jacques B. Brunius 
 1939: The White Slave by Marc Sorkin and Georg Wilhelm Pabst
 1939: La Fin du jour by Julien Duvivier
 1939: Le Jour Se Lève by Marcel Carné

Maurice Jaubert played a small role as an orchestra conductor in La Nuit de décembre by Kurt Bernhardt, produced in 1939.

Discography 
Except for soundtracks on films, his entire catalog consists of posthumously recorded music. 
 In 1943 three movements from his Intermède pour orchestre à cordes op.55 (Ouverture, Forlane, Musique de nuit) were recorded by the Orchestre Marius-François Gaillard
 Georges Delerue conducts the film music of Maurice Jaubert : Le Jour se lève, L'Atalante, Le petit chaperon rouge, Un carnet de bal, Le Quai des brumes, Madrid Symphony Orchestra, Disques Cinémusique DCM 110 (recorded live in 1986, P 2003). Online presentation.
 Maurice Jaubert - L'Atalante, Quai des brumes et autres musiques de films : also includes excerpts from Zéro de conduite, 14 juillet and L'île de Pâques. Orchestras conducted by Patrice Mestral and Serge Baudo. Milan CD CH 274.
 Suite Française, Intermèdes and other Orchestral Works by l'Orchestre de chambre de Nice conducted by Jacques-Francis Manzone. Also includes piano pieces performed by Yoko Sawai, Disques Cinémusique Classique, recorded in 1989 and 2009, P 2009).  Online presentation.
 25 ans de musique de cinéma français, orchestra conducted by Serge Baudo : Excerpts from film music scores, movie songs and piano pieces performed by par Yoko Sawai, Disques Cinémusique DCM 122, (recorded in 1956 and 2009, P 2009). One third of the program is devoted to Maurice Jaubert. Online presentation.
 Concert Maurice Jaubert (2 CD) : Ballade, Trois psaumes pour le temps de guerre, Jeanne d'Arc, Géographies, Cantate pour le temps pascal. Choeur et orchestre national de la RTF conducted by Jean Martinon. Jacqueline Brumaire, soprano. Restored and edited version of a 1952 live recording, Disques Cinémusique Classique (P 2017). Presentation online.
 A few of his songs have been recorded, by Paul Derenne, and Felicity Lott.

References

Sources
Biography attributed to Emmanuel Chamboredon from Milan Records.

External links
 bio & filmography
 non-film compositions
 1985 documentary by François Porcile
 Maurice Jaubert - Catalogue of works. Gérard Billaudot, éditeur, March 1999 accessed 5 June 2020. (Includes a short biography)

1900 births
1940 deaths
People from Nice
20th-century French composers
French film score composers
French male film score composers
French electronic musicians
French military personnel killed in World War II
Recipients of the Croix de Guerre 1939–1945 (France)
Burials at Montmartre Cemetery
Chevaliers of the Légion d'honneur
20th-century French male musicians
French Army personnel of World War II
French Army officers